Spencer's may refer to:

 Spencer's (department store), a defunct department store chain in British Columbia, Canada
 Spencer's Gifts, a North American retail chain
 Spencer Plaza in Chennai, India
 Spencer's Retail, a retail chain in India

See also
 Spencer (disambiguation)